Schlip is a settlement of about 1,500 inhabitants in the Rehoboth Rural constituency in the Hardap Region of central Namibia. Schlip is the main settlement of the ǁOgain (Groot Doden) clan of the Nama people.

References

Populated places in the Hardap Region